Tit-Coq (lit. "Little Rooster") is a Canadian film, directed by René Delacroix and Gratien Gélinas, and released in 1953. Gélinas' immensely popular play started life as a film script, but when he had difficulty with the financing he performed it on stage. By 1952 he was able to raise the money. Filmed essentially as it appeared on stage, it tells the story of Tit-Coq (Gélinas), a shy, awkward French-Canadian soldier with an irreverent sense of humour who falls for the sister (Monique Miller) of a friend (Clément Latour). She promises to wait for him when he is sent to fight overseas during World War II, but she doesn’t. When Tit-Coq returns he is once again alone in the world.

The film's cast also includes Juliette Béliveau, Denise Pelletier and Jean Duceppe.

The film won the Canadian Film Award for Film of the Year at the 5th Canadian Film Awards in 1953. Gélinas was so moved by the victory that he began to cry during his acceptance speech, and presenter Dorothy Lamour pulled the handkerchief out of his suit pocket and began to dab at his eyes as he spoke.

A restored print of the film was screened at the 2000 Toronto International Film Festival, before going into a limited run at repertory theatres.

References

External links

1953 films
Canadian drama films
Quebec films
Best Picture Genie and Canadian Screen Award winners
Canadian World War II films
Canada in World War II
1953 drama films
Canadian black-and-white films
1950s French-language films
French-language Canadian films
1950s Canadian films
Films directed by René Delacroix